The International Olympic Stadium, also known as the Rashid Karami Municipal Stadium, is a 22,400 capacity multi-purpose stadium in Tripoli, Lebanon. Formerly used  for football matches, the stadium is mainly used for international rugby league tests. It also has athletics facilities.

The stadium is the home ground of the Lebanon national rugby league team. It hosted the 2000 AFC Asian Cup, alongside the Camille Chamoun Sports City Stadium and the Saida International Stadium.

References 

Football venues in Lebanon
Rugby league stadiums in Lebanon
Sports venues in Lebanon
AFC Asian Cup stadiums
Multi-purpose stadiums in Lebanon